was a Japanese actress. She appeared in more than 80 films between 1920 and 1970.

Selected filmography
 Wife! Be Like a Rose! (1935)
 The Daughter of the Samurai (1937)
 Young People (1937)
 Spring on Leper's Island (1940)
 Listen to the Voices of the Sea (1950)
 Story of a Beloved Wife (1951)
 The Tale of Genji (1951)
 Children of Hiroshima (1952)
 Rikon (1952)
 Epitome (1953)
 Life of a Woman (1953)
 The Elegant Life of Mr. Everyman (1963)

References

External links

1900 births
1970 deaths
Japanese film actresses
People from Kure, Hiroshima
20th-century Japanese actresses
Actors from Hiroshima Prefecture